Deucher is an extinct town in Washington County, in the U.S. state of Ohio. The GNIS classifies it as a populated place.

A post office called Deucher was established in 1885, and remained in operation until 1950. Daniel Deucher was a partner in the firm of Bliss & Deucher, the town merchants.

References

Unincorporated communities in Washington County, Ohio
Unincorporated communities in Ohio